The 2017 Maltese Super Cup was the 33rd Maltese Super Cup, an annual football match played between the title holders of the Maltese Premier League and the Maltese FA Trophy. It was contested by Hibernians, winners of the 2016–17 Maltese Premier League, and Floriana, the winners of the 2016–17 Maltese FA Trophy, at Ta' Qali National Stadium on 13 December 2017. Floriana won 1–0 to win their second Maltese Super Cup.

Match

Details

References

1
2017–18 in European football
2017 in association football
Maltese Super Cup